Encounter is a Canadian talk show television program which aired on CBC Television in 1960.

Premise
Nathan Cohen hosted this interview program with guests such as James Baldwin, Samuel Freedman, John Kenneth Galbraith, Stanley Kramer, Louis Kronenberger, Marshall McLuhan, Karl Shapiro and E. W. R. Steacie (National Research Council president).

Scheduling
This half-hour program was broadcast on Sundays at 10:30 p.m. (Eastern) from 9 October to 18 December 1960. Encounter temporarily replaced Fighting Words, also hosted by Cohen.

References

External links
 

CBC Television original programming
1960 Canadian television series debuts
1960 Canadian television series endings
1960s Canadian television talk shows